West Dorset District Council in Dorset, England existed from 1974 to 2019. The council was abolished and subsumed into Dorset Council in 2019.

Political control
The first elections to the council were held in 1973, initially operating as a shadow authority prior to the district coming into effect the following year. From 1973 until its abolition in 2019 political control of the council was held by the following parties:

Leadership
The leaders of the council from 2001 until the council's abolition in 2019 were:

Council elections
1973 West Dorset District Council election
1976 West Dorset District Council election
1979 West Dorset District Council election
1983 West Dorset District Council election (New ward boundaries)
1984 West Dorset District Council election
1986 West Dorset District Council election
1987 West Dorset District Council election
1991 West Dorset District Council election (District boundary changes took place but the number of seats remained the same)
1995 West Dorset District Council election
1999 West Dorset District Council election

District result maps

By-election results
By-elections occur when seats become vacant between council elections. Below is a summary of by-elections from 1997 to 2019; full by-election results can be found by clicking on the by-election name.

References

External links
Dorsetforyou.com

 
West Dorset District
Council elections in Dorset
District council elections in England